Frédéric Beauchemin is a Canadian politician, who was elected to the National Assembly of Quebec in the 2022 Quebec general election. He represents the riding of Marguerite-Bourgeoys as a member of the Quebec Liberal Party. He previously ran as a Liberal candidate in the 2019 Canadian federal election, being defeated in Terrebonne by incumbent Bloc Québécois MP Michel Boudrias.

Electoral record

References

21st-century Canadian politicians
Quebec Liberal Party MNAs
Living people
Year of birth missing (living people)
Politicians from Montreal
French Quebecers